The  were a mythical people of ancient Japan mentioned in the Kojiki, believed to have lived in the south of Kyūshū until at least the Nara period. The last leader of the Kumaso, Torishi-Kaya was killed by Yamato Takeru in 397. The name of Kumamoto Prefecture originates from the Kumaso people.

Origins 
Scholars such as Kakubayashi Fumio, "although information is extremely limited", concluded that they were of Austronesian origin based on some linguistic and cultural evidence, theorising that the word kaya, present in personal names or titles, such as Torishi-Kaya, has the same root as Tagalog "kaya", meaning "ability; capability; competence; resources; wealth" and Malay and Indonesian "kaya", meaning "rich, wealthy, having wealth". The So present in Kumaso was also theorised to have the same origins as tsuo, tsau, thau, sau, tau, tao supposedly meaning "people" in Austronesian languages.

Overview 
William George Aston, in his translation of the Nihongi, says Kumaso refers to two separate tribes, Kuma (meaning "bear") and So (written with the character for "attack" or "layer on"). In his translation of the Kojiki, Basil Hall Chamberlain records that the region is also known simply as So district, and elaborates on the Yamato-centric description of a "bear-like" people, based on their violent interactions or physical distinctiveness. (The people called tsuchigumo by the Yamato people provide a better-known example of the transformation of other tribes into legendary monsters. Tsuchigumo—the monstrous "ground spider" of legend—is speculated to refer originally to the native pit dwellings of that people.) 

Geographically, Aston records that the Kumaso domain encompassed the historical provinces of Hyūga, Ōsumi, and Satsuma (contemporaneous with Aston's translation), or present-day Miyazaki and Kagoshima prefectures.

The last leader of the Kumaso, Torishi-Kaya, aka Brave of Kahakami, was assassinated in the winter of 397 by Prince Yamato Takeru of Yamato, who was disguised for this as a woman at a banquet.

Legacy 
The word Kuma ('Bear') survives today as Kumamoto Prefecture ('source of the bear'), and Kuma District, Kumamoto. Kuma District is known for a distinct dialect, Kuma Dialect.

People of the Kumaso mentioned in the Nihongi
Torishi-Kaya (aka Brave of Kahakami): a leader of the Kumaso
Atsukaya: a leader of the Kumaso
Sakaya: a leader of the Kumaso
Ichi-fukaya: Emperor Keikō married her 82 AD and in the same year put her to death, since she was involved in the assassination which killed her father.
Ichi-kaya: younger sister of Ichi-fukaya

See also
 Hayato people
 Bear worship

References

Tribes of ancient Japan